Kuaizhou (KZ, meaning "speedy vessel") (also called Feitian Emergency Satellite Launch System, Feitian-1, FT-1) is a family of Chinese "quick-reaction" orbital launch vehicles. Flying since 2013, Kuaizhou 1 and 1A consist of three solid-fueled rocket stages, with a liquid-fueled fourth stage as part of the satellite system. Kuaizhou 11, which flew an unsuccessful maiden flight in July 2020 (and successful second flight in 2022), is a larger model able to launch a  payload into low Earth orbit. Heavy-lift models KZ-21 and KZ-31 are in development. The Kuaizhou series of rockets is manufactured by ExPace, a subsidiary of China Aerospace Science and Industry Corporation (CASIC), as their commercial launch vehicles.

History 

The rocket series is based on CASIC's Anti-satellite weapon (ASAT) and BMD mid-course interceptor rockets, in particular the DF-21 Intermediate-range ballistic missile (IRBM) (another Chinese rocket that was based on DF-21 was the Kaituozhe-1). Development on the KZ launch vehicles started in 2009. The Kuaizhou launch vehicles were to provide an integrated launch vehicle system with the rapid ability to replace Chinese satellites that might be damaged or destroyed in an act of aggression in orbit. The vehicle uses mobile launch platform. The launch vehicle is operated by the PLA Rocket Force.

The maiden flight of Kuaizhou 1 launch vehicle, orbiting the Kuaizhou 1 natural disaster monitoring satellite, occurred on 25 September 2013, launched from Jiuquan Satellite Launch Center.

Second flight of Kuaizhou 1 launch vehicle, orbiting the Kuaizhou 2 natural disaster monitoring satellite, was launched at 06:37 UTC on 21 November 2014, again from Jiuquan Satellite Launch Center.

The first commercial launch inaugurated the Kuaizhou 1A version on 9 January 2017, from Jiuquan Satellite Launch Center. It placed three small satellites into a polar orbit.

The maiden launch of Kuaizhou 11 was on 10 July 2020. The launch was a failure, and the rocket was initially declared retired in April 2022, but later that year it was revealed that a second launch was planned for December. The successful launch of Kuaizhou 11 on 7 December 2022 marked the rocket's return to service.

Specifications 
The solid-fuel KZ-1A can place 200 kg payload into a Sun-synchronous orbit at an altitude of 700 kilometres. The KZ-11 version is able to put 1000 kg to the same orbit.

Launch preparations are designed to take very little time, and the launch can be conducted on rough terrain. The rocket's low requirements for launch help with cost savings, yielding a launch price under US$10,000 per kilogram of payload. This price level is very competitive in the international market.

Satellites can be installed on a Kuaizhou launch vehicle and stored in a maintenance facility. Once needed, the launch vehicle is deployed by a Transporter erector launcher (TEL) vehicle to a secure location. Launch readiness time can be as short as several hours.

Models

List of launches

See also 

 Kaituozhe-1, a previous Chinese small lift orbital launcher based on the DF-21 IRBM.
 China National Space Administration
 ExPace
 Long March (rocket family)
 Space program of China
 Small-lift launch vehicle

References 

Space launch vehicles of China
Vehicles introduced in 2013
2013 in China